Sam Ernst is a television writer and producer best known for working on shows such as Daredevil, Carnival Row, Hand of God, Haven, and The Dead Zone. He frequently collaborates with his writing partner Jim Dunn. In 2010, he and Dunn co-created the Syfy supernatural drama series Haven, based upon the Stephen King short story "The Colorado Kid". Since April 2005, he and Dunn have co-run a podcast website called "Sam and Jim Go to Hollywood", where they chronicle their experiences in Hollywood.

Career 
Ernst co-wrote a film entitled "Myron's Movie" in 2004. Directed by Maggie Soboil, the film premiered at the 2004 Fargo Film Festival and won the festival's Best Narrative Feature award.

The Dead Zone episodes 
 "Re-Entry" (6.03)
 "Outcome" (6.08)

References

External links 

American television producers
American television writers
American male television writers
Living people
Year of birth missing (living people)
Place of birth missing (living people)